Dali University is a provincial full-time comprehensive university approved by the Chinese Ministry of Education.

It is located in the famous tourist city Dali, Yunnan, which was the capital of Nanzhao Country over 1,000 years ago. The University has two campuses, one is ancient city and the other is water lily. It covers an area of 2,500 mu or about 410 acres. And it covers ten academic disciplines, including education, management, economics, law, philosophy, literature, science, engineering, medicine, agriculture and art. The University has one college, sixteen schools, eight research institutes, forty-nine undergraduate degree programs, twenty-eight master's degree programs and more than seventeen thousand full-time students. The university is located in the foothills of the Cang Mountains, overlooking Erhai Lake and the city of Dali. It is honored as University in the landscape, the landscape of the University.

Dali University specializes in research and teaching. It employs 971 full-time teacher, 122 professors, 287 associate professors. 

Dali University is an international university that enjoys a high reputation in Southeast Asia and throughout South Asia. As of 2013, there were more than 5000 international students graduated from Dali University. They were from 42 countries and regions, including Thailand, Laos, Cambodia, Nepal, India, Pakistan, Bangladesh, USA and South Korea. As of 2011, there were 759 full-time international students. The University has established many exchange and cooperation projects and academic research working with more than 40 foreign universities. As of 2012, according to the Chinese Ministry of Education, Dali University ranked the most foreign bachelor's degree students in Yunnan Province. It was 34 out of 2490 in the country for foreigners getting a bachelor's degree.

Campus
Dali University covers an area of 2,500 mu (about 410 acres) located in China’s historical and cultural city Dali (Ancient Town). It has two campuses, one is at Gucheng (Ancient City campus) and the other one is at Xiaguan (Water Lily Campus). The Ancient City campus is located in the foothills of the Cangshan mountains, overlooking the Erhai Lake and the city of Dali. The Water Lily Campus is located in downtown.

Dali University's buildings are a blend of ancient and contemporary art. The University campus consists of large academic buildings, dormitory buildings, libraries, large parks like public spaces, athletics facilities, department stores, dining halls and the central administrative offices. The University provides shuttle bus service inside campus. Additionally, just outside the university main gate, students can access public transport to downtown or other stations.

Academics

Research

 National Level Research Projects 76
 International Research＆Protection Projects 7
 Monographs and Teaching Materials 115
 SCI ＆ EI 146 

 Provincial Level Research Projects 109
 China Invention Patents 71
 Papers 2800

Academic organization

College
Dali College

Schools

 School of Education 
 School of Agriculture and Biology Science
 School of Chinese Language and Literature 
 School of Foreign Languages
 School of Pre-clinical  
 School of Art
 School of Nursing 
 School of Sports Science

 School of Economics and Management
 School of Public Health
 School of Mathematics and Computer
 School of Engineering
 School of Marxism
 School of Pharmacy and Chemistry
 School of continuing education
 School of Clinical Medicine

Research institutes

 National Culture Research
 Materia Medica Research
 Erhai Lake Resource Protection Research
 Tourism Culture Research

 Eastern-Himalaya Biodiversity Research
 Pathogens and Vectors Research
 Economics Research
 Astronomy and History of Science and Technology Research

Academic exchanges
Established partnership with Fauna & Flora International（FFI）
Established partnership with The Nature Conservancy (TNC)
Established partnership with Association of Zoos and Aquariums (AZA)
Sign a cooperation agreement with Phranakhon Rajabhat University, Kingdom of Thailand)
Mr Laurie, the famous psychiatrist, the professor of Edinburgh University held a lecture 2013.08
The academic symposium between the Association of Southeast Asian Nations’universities and Chinese universities    2013.03
Teaching master's degree courses with Deakin University (Australia)    2012.12
The academic symposium of China's geophysical and applied mathematics    2012.09
Sign a cooperation agreement with Namseoul University (South Korea)   2012.09
The academic symposium of the law between China and Japan     2012.03
Sign a cooperation agreement with Sunraysia Institute of TAFE (Australia)     2011.09
The meet of exchange between Korea Maritime University and Dali University 2010.12
The first international academic symposium of the Bai nationality language 2009.08
The academic symposium of the folklore cross-strait 2008.05
The symposium of minority traditional culture protection in Dali-Lijiang Railway District with the Asian development bank    2008.03
The academic symposium of the Bai nationality folk song with Japan 2006.08

Libraries and collection
Dali University Libraries are networking, electronics and intelligence, and holding some 2.15 million volumes.

Dali University has one collection, saving a lot of ethnic medicine literature and many historical references of the local culture that are more than one thousand years old.

Rankings and reputation 
As of 2022, the Best Chinese Universities Ranking ranked Dali University 5th in Yunnan Province after (Yunnan University, Kunming University of Science and Technology, Yunnan Normal University, and Yunnan Agricultural University) and 308th in China. Dali is the only university in Dali City to rank among the top 5 universities in Yunnan province, apart from major universities, located in the provincial capital city of Kunming.

Dili University ranked 2295th worldwide and 371th in China by the University Rankings by Academic Performance 2021/22.

International Co-operation

Representatives and Delegations  from Puducherry / Pondicherry ( Mr. K Lakshminarayanan - MLA , Former Minister , Mrs. Radha Srinivasagoplane , Dr. Bikash Kali Das - Chinese Consultant ) visited Dali University    2016 .07. 29

The consul general and vice consul general of Australia consulate general in Chengdu visited Dali University        2014.02

The delegation from Thailand's ministry of education visited Dali University        2013.07

The Republic of Suriname ambassador visited Dali University      2013.02

The vice president of faculty of education of Deakin University in Australia visited Dali University     2012.09

The ambassador of Thailand's foreign office and diplomatic academy visited Dali University      2012.09

The delegation of Burma’s association of culture and education visited Dali University     2012.09

Nepal Medical Association delegation visited Dali University      2011.10

The Mildura City (in Australia) delegation visited Dali University      2011.09

Taiwan's Chienkuo Technology University delegation visited Dali University 2011.08

The South and South-east Asia press corps visited Dali University      2011.06

The women's basketball team of St. Mary’s College of Maryland visited Dali University     2011.05

The consul general of Pakistan consulate general in Chengdu visited Dali University       2011.04

The economic counselor of consulate general of Pakistan in Chengdu visited Dali University. 2011.03

References

External links
 Official Website
 Institute of Eastern-Himalaya Biodiversity Research

Universities and colleges in Yunnan
Buildings and structures in Dali Bai Autonomous Prefecture